Great Day  is a 1945 British drama film directed by Lance Comfort and starring Eric Portman, Flora Robson and Sheila Sim. It is based on the play of the same name by Lesley Storm.

It was made at Denham Studios with location filming at various sites including Denham village. The film's sets were designed by the art director William C. Andrews. The film recorded a loss of £1,511.

Plot
The small (fictional) English village of Denley is thrown into excitement by the impending 'surprise' visit of Eleanor Roosevelt. However, the family of the impoverished local squire, whose wife is the moving spirit of the local Women's Institute, is faced with several crises.

Margaret 'Meg' Ellis, their daughter, works as a Land Girl on a nearby farm. She is loved by the farm's owner, who is twice her age, but is reluctant to allow him to announce their engagement, as she is still being wooed by her former boyfriend, now an army officer. The farmer's unmarried sister is openly bitter at the prospect of Meg becoming mistress of the property.

Captain John Ellis, her father, a decorated hero of World War 1 and now a frustrated alcoholic, is arrested in a local pub for attempted theft of a ten shilling note to buy drinks.

Released from custody later that evening, he cannot face the humiliation in his small community and wanders into the woods to commit suicide. His wife, realising what has happened, sends Margaret to talk to him. They convince him to face up to his problems and assure him that they love him.

As Mrs Roosevelt arrives, John and his family take their place in the welcoming throng, with John proudly wearing his medal ribbons.

Cast
 Eric Portman as Captain John Ellis
 Flora Robson as Mrs Liz Ellis
 Sheila Sim as Margaret Ellis
 Isabel Jeans as Lady Mott
 Walter Fitzgerald as Bob Tyndale
 Philip Friend as Geoffrey Winthrop
 Marjorie Rhodes as Nora Mumford
 Maire O'Neill as Bridget Walsh
 John Laurie as Scottish officer
 Kathleen Harrison as Pub customer
 Leslie Dwyer as Pub customer
 Margaret Withers as Jane Tyndale
 Beatrice Varley as Miss Tracy
 Irene Handl as Tea stall lady
 Patricia Hayes as Mrs Beadle

References

External links
 
 
Review of film at Variety

1945 films
1945 drama films
Films directed by Lance Comfort
British drama films
British black-and-white films
Films scored by William Alwyn
Films set in England
Films shot at Denham Film Studios
RKO Pictures films
British films based on plays
1940s English-language films
1940s British films